The 1959 Pittsburgh Steelers season was the franchise's 27th in the National Football League.

Regular season

Schedule

Game summaries

Week 1 (Saturday September 26, 1959): Cleveland Browns 

at Forbes Field, Pittsburgh, Pennsylvania

 Game time: 
 Game weather: 
 Game attendance: 33,844
 Referee: 
 TV announcers: 

Scoring drives:

 Cleveland – Plum 1 run (Groza kick) CLE 7–0
 Pittsburgh – FG Layne 26 CLE 7–3
 Pittsburgh – Orr 20 pass from Layne (Layne kick)PIT 10–7
 Pittsburgh – Brewster 19 pass from Layne (Bobby PIT 17-7ne kick)

Week 2 (Sunday October 4, 1959): Washington Redskins  

at Forbes Field, Pittsburgh, Pennsylvania

 Game time: 
 Game weather: 
 Game attendance: 26,750
 Referee: 
 TV announcers: 

Scoring drives:

 Washington – FG Baker 25 WSH 3–0
 Washington – FG Baker 47 WSH 3–0
 Washington – FG Baker 48 WSH 9–0
 Washington – Anderson 70 pass from Gugliemi (Baker kick) WSH 16–0
 Pittsburgh – FG Layne 32 WSH 16–3
 Washington – Walton 26 pass from Gugliemi (Baker kick)WSH 23–3
 Pittsburgh – Brewster 30 pass from Layne (Bobby WSH 23-10 NEKICK)  
 Pittsburgh – Krutko 2 run (Layne kick)WSH 23–17

Week 3 (Sunday October 11, 1959): Philadelphia Eagles

Week 4 (Sunday October 18, 1959): Washington Redskins  

at Griffith Stadium, Washington, DC

 Game time: 
 Game weather: 
 Game attendance: 28,218
 Referee: 
 TV announcers: 

Scoring drives:

 Pittsburgh – Krutko 1 run (Layne kick)
 Pittsburgh – Tarasovic 38 fumble run (Layne kick)
 Washington – FG Baker 30
 Washington – FG Baker 39
 Pittsburgh – Krutko 4 run (Layne kick)
 Pittsburgh – FG Layne 23
 Pittsburgh – FG Layne 22

Week 5 (Sunday October 25, 1959): New York Giants  

at Forbes Field, Pittsburgh, Pennsylvania

 Game time: 
 Game weather: 
 Game attendance: 33,596
 Referee: 
 TV announcers: 

Scoring drives:

 Pittsburgh – FG Layne 37
 New York Giants – Gifford 77 pass from Conerly (Summerall kick)
 New York Giants – Gifford 28 pass from Conerly (Summerall kick)
 Pittsburgh – Dial 35 pass from Layne (Layne kick)
 Pittsburgh – FG Layne 19
 New York Giants – Huff 5 fumble run (Summerall kick)
 Pittsburgh – FG Layne 17

Week 6 (Sunday November 1, 1959): Chicago Cardinals  

at Comiskey Park, Chicago, Illinois

 Game time: 
 Game weather: 
 Game attendance: 
 Referee: 
 TV announcers:

Week 7 (Sunday November 8, 1959): Detroit Lions  

at Forbes Field, Pittsburgh, Pennsylvania

 Game time: 
 Game weather: 
 Game attendance: 24,614
 Referee: 
 TV announcers: 

Scoring drives:

 Detroit – Rote 1 run (Perry kick)
 Pittsburgh – FG Layne 29
 Detroit – FG Martin 27
 Pittsburgh – Tracy 20 pass from Layne (Layne kick)

Week 8 (Sunday November 15, 1959): New York Giants  

at Yankee Stadium, Bronx, New York

 Game time: 
 Game weather: 
 Game attendance: 66,786
 Referee: 
 TV announcers: 

Scoring drives:

 New York Giants – FG Summerall 21
 New York Giants – FG Summerall 27
 Pittsburgh – Orr 4 pass from Layne (Layne kick)
 New York Giants – FG Summerall 29
 Pittsburgh – Tracy 45 pass from Layne (Layne kick)

Week 9 (Sunday November 22, 1959): Cleveland Browns  

at Cleveland Municipal Stadium, Cleveland, Ohio

 Game time: 
 Game weather: 
 Game attendance: 68,563
 Referee: 
 TV announcers: 

Scoring drives:

 Pittsburgh – Tracy 4 run (Layne kick)
 Pittsburgh – Tracy 1 run (Layne kick)
 Cleveland – Renfro 30 pass from Plum (kick failed)
 Cleveland – Renfro 28 pass from Plum (Groza kick)
 Cleveland – Renfro 70 pass from Plum (Groza kick)
 Pittsburgh – Nagler 17 pass from Layne (Layne kick)

Week 10 (Sunday November 29, 1959): Philadelphia Eagles  

at Forbes Field, Pittsburgh, Pennsylvania

 Game time: 
 Game weather: 
 Game attendance: 22,191
 Referee: 
 TV announcers: 

Scoring drives:

 Pittsburgh – FG Layne 17
 Pittsburgh – Dial 12 pass from Layne (Layne kick)
 Pittsburgh – Orr 19 pass from Layne (Layne kick)
 Pittsburgh – Tracy 23 pass from Layne (Layne kick)
 Pittsburgh – Nagler 2 pass from Layne (Layne kick)

Week 11 (Sunday December 5, 1959): Chicago Bears  

at Forbes Field, Pittsburgh, Pennsylvania

 Game time: 
 Game weather: 
 Game attendance: 41,476
 Referee: 
 TV announcers: 

Scoring drives:

 Chicago Bears – Casares 3 run (kick failed)
 Chicago Bears – Casares 1 run (Aveni kick)
 Chicago Bears – Casares 1 run (Aveni kick)
 Pittsburgh – Tracy 2 run (Layne kick)
 Chicago Bears – Casares 1 run (Aveni kick)
 Pittsburgh – Krutko 7 run (Layne kick)
 Pittsburgh – Dial 25 pass from Layne (Layne kick)

Week 12 (Sunday December 12, 1959): Chicago Cardinals  

at Forbes Field, Pittsburgh, Pennsylvania

 Game time: 
 Game weather: 
 Game attendance: 19,011
 Referee: 
 TV announcers: 

Scoring drives:

 Chicago Cardinals – FG Conrad 37
 Chicago Cardinals – FG Conrad 20
 Pittsburgh – Layne 9 run (Layne kick)
 Pittsburgh – Dial 35 pass from Layne (Layne kick)
 Pittsburgh – Dial 11 pass from Layne (Layne kick)
 Pittsburgh – Tracy 16 pass from Layne (Layne kick)
 Chicago Cardinals – Conrad 21 pass from Hill (Conrad kick)
 Pittsburgh – Orr 16 pass from Layne (Layne kick)
 Chicago Cardinals – Crow 7 pass from Hill (Conrad kick)

Standings

References

Pittsburgh Steelers seasons
Pittsburgh Steelers
Pitts